Thingoe Rural District was a rural district in the county of West Suffolk, England. It was created in 1894. On 1 April 1935 the parish of Depden was transferred to the Clare Rural District. On the same date the district was enlarged by the transfer of the civil parishes of Barnham, Barningham, Coney Weston, Euston, Fakenham Magna, Hepworth, Honington, Hopton, Knettishall, Market Weston, Sapiston, and Thelnetham from the disbanded Brandon Rural District.

It was named after the ancient Hundred of Thingoe ("thing-hoe" – "assembly-mound") and administered from Bury St Edmunds, which it surrounded.

Since 1 April 1974 it has formed part of the Borough of St Edmundsbury.

At the time of its dissolution it consisted of the following 58 parishes.

Statistics

References

History of Suffolk
Districts of England created by the Local Government Act 1894
Districts of England abolished by the Local Government Act 1972
Rural districts of England